The Galite Islands (Tunisian Arabic:  جالطة Jalita, French: La Galite, Italian: Isola della Caletta) are a rocky group of islands of volcanic origin that belong to Bizerte Governorate, northern Tunisia. The islands of the group sit atop Banc de Galite.

Main island
The main island has 200m high cliffs and is accessible only in the south on the bay Escueil de Pasque. A few fishermen's families live on the island. The highest peak at 391m is Bout de Somme (Grand Sommet), which is topped by a yellow lookout tower. Piton de l'Es', a prominent cone-shaped peak close to the most southeasterly point of the island, is 360m high.

Other islands
Besides the main island La Galite, there are two groups of islets or rocks, which are all inaccessible.

They consist of the second largest and third largest islands of the Galite Islands, 158m high Le Galiton (area 0.4 km2) and 137m high La Fauchelle, immediately southeast of Le Galiton. On the peak of Le Galiton is a lighthouse, 14m high. In 1980, the Ministry of Agriculture declared Le Galiton a natural reserve, to protect the Mediterranean monk seals.

This group consists of three rocks, which are, from north to south, Gallo, Pollastro and Gallina (meaning "rooster", "chicken" and "hen" in Italian). Gallo is the largest of the three and is 119 m high.

About  to the southwest are the Sorelle Rocks, or Écueil des Sorelles, which consist of two shallow rocky patches. A lighted buoy, fitted with a racon, is moored to the western patch, and another buoy to the eastern patch. A two meters high concrete block stands on the western patch.

 to the north of the group is the submerged Banc des Mazzarilles, with depths between 21 and 49 meters.

During World War II, La Galite hosted a small Italian naval base. Salvatore Todaro (it), an Italian war hero, died on La Galite in December 14, 1942.

Tunisian independence leader Habib Bourguiba was exiled to La Galite by the French colonial authorities from May 21, 1952 through May 20, 1954.

Natural history
The islands have been recognised as an Important Bird Area (IBA) by BirdLife International because they support populations of Audouin's gulls, Eleonora's falcons and Sardinian warblers.

Notes and references

External links

Islands of Tunisia
Important Bird Areas of Tunisia
Important Bird Areas of Mediterranean islands
Seabird colonies